McGlasson is a surname. Notable people with the surname include:

Carter "Fever One" McGlasson (born 1970), American breakdancer
Ed McGlasson (born 1956), American football player

See also
3300 McGlasson, main-belt asteroid